The 1878 United States House of Representatives elections in South Carolina were held on November 5, 1878 to select five Representatives for two-year terms from the state of South Carolina.  Two Democratic incumbents were re-elected, two Republican incumbents were defeated and the open seat was picked up by the Democrats.  The composition of the state delegation after the election was solely Democratic.

Voter fraud
South Carolina was one state rampant with voter fraud, particularly through the use of tissue ballots, thin ballots hidden in the normal ballot, typically 10 to 20 at a time.  The almost statewide exclusion of Republicans as Commissioners of Elections, and the ensuing appointment of nearly all Democratic Managers of Elections, allowed to Democratic Managers to perpetrate this scheme.  When the votes were counted and more votes than voters were found, the Managers removed and destroyed the Republican ballots resulting in the complete takeover of the state.

1st congressional district
Incumbent Republican Congressman Joseph Rainey of the 1st congressional district, in office since 1870, was defeated by Democratic challenger John S. Richardson.

General election results

|-
| 
| colspan=5 |Democratic gain from Republican
|-

2nd congressional district
Incumbent Republican Congressman Richard H. Cain of the 2nd congressional district, in office since 1877, declined to seek re-election.  Democrat Michael P. O'Connor, a contestant in the 1876 election, defeated Republican Edmund William McGregor Mackey in the general election.

General election results

|-
| 
| colspan=5 |Democratic gain from Republican
|-

3rd congressional district
Incumbent Democratic Congressman D. Wyatt Aiken of the 3rd congressional district, in office since 1877, defeated Republican challenger J.F. Ensor.

General election results

|-
| 
| colspan=5 |Democratic hold
|-

4th congressional district
Incumbent Democratic Congressman John H. Evins of the 4th congressional district, in office since 1877, defeated Republican challenger Alexander S. Wallace.

General election results

|-
| 
| colspan=5 |Democratic hold
|-

5th congressional district
Incumbent Republican Congressman Robert Smalls of the 5th congressional district, in office since 1875, was defeated by Democratic challenger George D. Tillman.

General election results

|-
| 
| colspan=5 |Democratic gain from Republican
|-

See also
United States House of Representatives elections, 1878
South Carolina gubernatorial election, 1878
South Carolina's congressional districts

References

"Annual Report of the Secretary of State to the General Assembly of South Carolina." Reports and Resolutions of the General Assembly of the State of South Carolina at the Regular Session of 1878. Columbia, SC: Calvo and Patton, 1878, pp. 440–444.

United States House of Representatives
1878
South Carolina